The Noronha elaenia (Elaenia ridleyana) is a species of bird in the tyrant-flycatcher family Tyrannidae. It is endemic to Fernando de Noronha, a small archipelago off the coast of Brazil. The species was formerly considered a subspecies of the large elaenia, but differs considerably in the calls and song.

The Noronha elaenia is a large-sized elenia,  in length. It has an olive-brown slightly crested head, olive-brown upperparts and dusky wings with white wingbars. The throat and breast are grey fading to a yellowish belly. The two sexes are the same in appearance and the plumage of juvenile plumage has not been described. It sits upright while hunting.

It lives in a variety of habitats on Fernando de Noronha, including forest, open woodland, scrubland and thickets around houses. It feeds on insects and will also take fruit, including from the fig Ficus noronhae.

It is threatened by habitat loss. The total global range of this species is only , and most of the forest on Fernando de Noronha has been lost since the arrival of European settlers, and this species is the least common landbird remaining on the island. The current population has been surveyed and is estimated to be around 480 birds. Plans to develop tourism on the island could put the species under further pressure by changing more habitat and risk introducing rats or other introduced species.

References

External links
Species factsheet - BirdLife International

Noronha elaenia
Endemic birds of Brazil
Fernando de Noronha
Noronha elaenia
Taxonomy articles created by Polbot